Faber Drive is a four-piece Juno Award-nominated Canadian pop punk band from Mission, British Columbia, formed in 2004. The band consists of lead vocalist Dave Faber, lead guitarist Jordan Pritchett, bass guitarist Jeremy "Krikit" Liddle and drummer Seamus O'Neill. Their biggest influences are U2, The Police, Def Leppard, Jimmy Eat World, Stryper and Winger. They have toured with bands such as Hedley, Stereos, Marianas Trench, Simple Plan and Metro Station.

Biography
In 2005, the band released a limited-edition three-song EP under the band name 'Faber' but, due to legal issues with a large corporation of the same name, its name was changed to Faber Drive. Also in 2005, Faber Drive won Fox Seeds, the band competition of Vancouver radio station CFOX-FM. They were then discovered by Chad Kroeger of Nickelback, who signed the band to his 604 Records label. Faber Drive released their debut album Seven Second Surgery on May 1, 2007, which was followed by the release of four singles. 

The Faber Drive songs "Killin' Me" and "Summer Fades to Fall" appeared in American drama television series Kyle XY. The band also physically appeared on the show, playing in concert (Episode 3.01, "Psychic Friend", January 19, 2009).

History

Seven Second Surgery
After signing with 604 Records, the band connected with Joey Moi for pre-production and Brian Howes to co-write with Faber. Seven Second Surgery was released on May 1, 2007. They went on tour, and released four singles and videos from Seven Second Surgery: "Second Chance", "Tongue Tied", "When I'm with You", and "Sleepless Nights" (featuring Brian Melo). While "Second Chance" and "Tongue Tied" had successful chart positions in the west of Canada, "When I'm With You" had its best chart positions in the east. 

In April 2008, Ray Bull left the band and was replaced by Calvin "Poncho" Lechner. A few months later, guitarist David Hinsley quit and was replaced by Zubin Thakkar, who played in the band's concerts until Faber Drive's last show in October 2008.

At the 2008 Juno Awards, Faber Drive was nominated as New Group of the Year.

Can't Keep a Secret
The band's second album, Can't Keep a Secret, was released on November 10, 2009. The lead single, "G-Get Up and Dance", was produced by Faber, Dave "Rave" Ogilvie (Nine Inch Nails) and Colin "Crocker" Friesen. It premiered on July 13, 2009, and went Gold after five weeks, reaching number 6 on the Canadian Hot 100. Guitarist Jordan Pritchett, son of country singer Aaron Pritchett, and drummer Andrew Stricko joined the band, replacing Hinsley and Lechner.

At the 2011 Juno Awards, Can't Keep a Secret was nominated as Pop Album of the Year.

Lost in Paradise
The band released their third studio album, Lost in Paradise, on August 28, 2012. Videos were shot for "Do It in Hollywood", "Candy Store" and "Life Is Waiting". Andrew Stricko left the band and Seamus O'Neill replaced him. The band headed across Canada on the successful Lost in Paradise tour in Fall/Winter 2012. They visited Singapore to perform two shows for Music Matters and performed at Canadian festivals during the summer of 2013. They released two more singles from their third studio album, "Too Little Too Late" (featuring Pierre Bouvier of Simple Plan) and "Dead On The Dancefloor" (featuring Proper Villains). Videos for these songs were never made, but Warner Music Philippines used the songs on a promotional sampler in 2014.

2014 to present
In June 2014, Faber Drive played one concert, appearing with Simple Plan in Kirkland Lake, ON, and released two demos: "The Best of Me" and "Gonna Make It". In September 2013, they performed a benefit concert in Abbotsford.

On December 4, 2016, the band held a reunion concert with special guests at the Hard Rock Casino  Vancouver, then released a Christmas song called "We 3 Kings". On March 13, 2017, they released demos for "More Than Perfect", "Without a Fight", "One Million" and "Done My Best". On August 5, 2018, they released a new single called "Surrender".

In 2019, the band released songs and videos for "What Are We Waiting For" (with Wolfgang Pander and Tamara Umlah), "Night Like This" (with Wolfgang Pander, Rod Black and David Hinsley), and "Mr Good For Nothin". They also released three collaborations with Faber's son Isaiah, the rapper Powfu: "To Be With You", "Chocolate Milk" and "I Can See the Light".. They collaborated with The Faceplants on an acoustic cover of "Have You Ever Seen the Rain?" and, with Faber's daughter Patience, aka Sleep.Ing, on "You Lift Me Up".

In 2020, they released demos for "Can We Talk", "Is Heaven Where You Are", and "Me Myself and I". 

As of 2021, Faber Drive remained on the 604 Records website but the band's website was defunct.

On March 3rd, 2023, Faber Drive released a single titled, “NEVER GONE.”

Members

Current members
Dave Faber – lead vocals, guitar (2004–present)
Jeremy "Krikit" Liddle – bass, vocals (2004–present)
Jordan "JP" Pritchett – lead guitar, vocals (2008–present)
Seamus O'Neill – drums, vocals (2012–present)

Former members
Ray 'red' Bull – drums, backing vocals (2004–2008)
David Hinsley – lead guitar, backing vocals (2004–2008)
Calvin Lechner – drums, backing vocals (2008)
Andrew Stricko – drums, backing vocals (2009–2012)

Touring members
 Zubin Thakkar – lead guitar and backing vocals (2008)
 Simon Nagel – lead guitar and backing vocals (2008)

Discography

Albums

EP

See also
 Faber Drive discography

References

External links
 Faber Drive TV on YouTube
 Official Faber Drive Street Team

Canadian pop punk groups
People from Mission, British Columbia
Musical groups established in 2004
Musical quartets
Musical groups from British Columbia
2004 establishments in British Columbia